Müveddet Kadın ("Duration"; born Şadiye Çıhçı, after 13 June 1949 Müveddet Çiftçi; 12 October 1893 – 20 December 1951) was the third consort of Sultan Mehmed VI of the Ottoman Empire.

Early life
Müveddet Kadın was born on 12 October 1893 in Derbent, İzmit. Born as Şadiye Çıhçı, she was a member of Abkhazian noble family, Çıhçi. Her father was Kato Davud Bey Çıhçı, and her mother was Ayşe Hanım. She was the paternal aunt of Mehmed VI's fourth consort, Nevvare Hanım, daughter of her brother Mustafa Bey.

Her paternal aunt Habibe Hanım, chief treasurer of Mehmed, took her in the Dolmabahçe Palace at the age of nine. Here her name according to the custom of the Ottomam court was changed to Müveddet. She was then placed in the service of Şayeste Hanım, Mehmed's adoptive mother, in the Çengelköy Palace. She was tall, with blue eyes and auburn hair.

First marriage
Müveddet married Mehmed on 24 April 1911 in the mansion of Çengelköy. A year after the marriage, on 5 November 1912, she gave birth to the couple's only son and only male of his father, Şehzade Mehmed Ertuğrul. After Mehmed's accession to the throne on 4 July 1918, she was given the title of "Second Kadın". Of the four consorts Mehmed had during his reign, Müveddet was the only one, apart from First Consort Nazikeda Kadın, to receive the title of Kadin. She probably got it because she was the mother of the sultan's only son. Müveddet was much loved by the sultan’s other daughters and by their grandchildren, who used to call her “Mini Anne”. Princess Leyla Açba described her as a shy, kind-hearted and hardworking woman. In 1918, her husband fell in love with Nevvare Hanım, her niece, and married her despite Müveddet's opposition.

Mehmed was deposed on 1 November 1922, and went to exile with their son Ertuğrul on 17 November 1922. She, together with other members of his family, was kept in house arrest at the Feriye Palace by order of the new parliament until 10 March 1924, when they were sent into exile. Müveddet, with Nazikeda, joined Mehmed in San Remo. She remained until Mehmed's death in 1926

Second marriage
Afterwards Mehmed's death, she moved to France with her step-daughter Ulviye Sultan  and later she went to Alexandria in 1929, and married Şakir Bey, son of Emin Pasha, in 1932. Her son always refused to accept his mother's second marriage, and never saw her again. They divorced on 28 February 1936.

Last years and death
Her only son’s sudden death in 1944 devastated Müveddet Kadın, who developed depression. She was finally allowed to return to Turkey in 1948, where she settled in a small room in Çengelköy Palace. On 13 June 1949 she became a Turkish citizen under the name of Müveddet Çiftçi. She died on 20 December 1951 in her small room Çengelköy Palace and was buried in the Çengelköy mausoleum.

Issue

In popular culture
Müveddet is a character in T. Byram Karasu's  historical novel Of God and Madness: A Historical Novel (2007).

See also
Kadın (title)
Ottoman Imperial Harem
List of consorts of the Ottoman sultans

References

Sources

1893 births
1951 deaths
Emigrants from the Ottoman Empire to Italy
Remarried royal consorts
People from the Ottoman Empire of Abkhazian descent
20th-century consorts of Ottoman sultans